Défense et illustration du cinéma égyptien (Arabic title: al-Sinima al-Misriya, English title: On Egyptian Cinema) is a 1989 documentary film by Moumen Smihi.

Synopsis 
The document presents Egyptian cinema as a burgeoning film industry of the developing third world.

References 

1989 films
1989 documentary films
Egyptian documentary films
Documentary films about the film industry